This is a list of lakes and reservoirs in the state of South Carolina in the United States. All major lakes in South Carolina are man-made.

Lakes in South Carolina

Alcohol and Drug Abuse Lake
Lake Blalock
Lake Bowen
Lake Brown
Lake Greenwood
Lake Hartwell
Lake Jocassee
John D. Long Lake
Lake Keowee
Lake Marion
Monticello Reservoir
Lake Moultrie
Lake Murray
Parr Reservoir
Pepsi Cola Lake
Richard B. Russell Lake
Saluda Lake
Lake Strom Thurmond
Swan Lake/Iris Gardens
Lake Tugalo
Lake Wateree
Lake Wylie
Lake Yonah
Lake Secession

See also

List of rivers of South Carolina

References

External links

 South Carolina Lakes Database and reviews

South Carolina
Lakes